The Taipei City Museum is a new exhibit hall being planned for construction in Taipei, Taiwan. City officials on July 24, 2008, announced plans to conduct an international design competition for the facility in tandem with plans for the Taipei Performing Arts Center.

See also
 List of museums in Taiwan

References

Museums in Taipei